Loni Kaye Anderson (born August 5, 1945) is an American actress. She played receptionist Jennifer Marlowe on the CBS sitcom WKRP in Cincinnati (1978–1982), which earned her three Golden Globe Awards and two Emmy Award nominations.

Early life 
Anderson was born in Saint Paul, Minnesota, the daughter of Klaydon Carl "Andy" Anderson, an environmental chemist, and Maxine Hazel (née Kallin), a model. She grew up in suburban Roseville, Minnesota. As a senior at Alexander Ramsey Senior High School in Roseville, she was voted Valentine Queen of the Valentine's Day Winter Formal of 1963. As she says in her autobiography, My Life in High Heels, her father was originally going to name her Leiloni, but realized that when she got to her teen years, it was likely to be twisted into "Lay Loni"—so it was changed to simply Loni.

Career 
Her acting debut came with a bit part in the film Nevada Smith (1966), starring Steve McQueen. After that, she was virtually unemployed as an actress for nearly a decade, before she finally received guest roles on television series in the mid-1970s. She appeared in two episodes of S.W.A.T., then on the sitcom Phyllis, and the detective series Police Woman and Harry O. 

She auditioned well for the role of Chrissy on the popular sitcom Three's Company. She did not win the role, but in 1978 guest-starred as Susan Walters on a season two episode, an appearance that brought her to the attention of the ABC network.

Anderson's most famous acting role came as the sultry receptionist Jennifer Marlowe on the sitcom WKRP in Cincinnati (1978–1982). She was offered the role when producers saw a poster of her in a red swimsuit—a pose similar to Farrah Fawcett's famous 1976 poster. The sitcom's creator, Hugh Wilson, later said Anderson got the role because her body resembled Jayne Mansfield's, and because she possessed the innocent sexuality of Marilyn Monroe.

Although the series suffered in the Nielsen ratings throughout most of its four-year run, it had a strong following among teens, young adults and disc jockeys. Owing to her rising popularity as the series' so-called "main attraction", Anderson walked out on the sitcom during the 1980 summer hiatus, requesting a substantial salary increase. While she was renegotiating her contract, she starred in the CBS made-for-television film The Jayne Mansfield Story (1980). When the network agreed to her requests, she returned to the series and remained until its cancellation in 1982. It has remained popular in syndication around the world.

Aside from her acting career, Anderson has become known for her colorful personal life, particularly her relationship and marriage to actor Burt Reynolds.
They starred in the comedy film Stroker Ace (1983), which was a critical and box office failure. She later appeared as herself in the romantic comedy The Lonely Guy (1984), starring Steve Martin. She voiced Flo, a collie in the animated classic film All Dogs Go to Heaven (1989).

In the mid-to-late 1980s, Anderson's acting career gradually declined. She was teamed with Wonder Woman actress Lynda Carter in the television series Partners in Crime in 1984. She appeared in television adaptations of classic Hollywood films, such as A Letter to Three Wives (1985) with Michele Lee, and Sorry, Wrong Number (1989) with Patrick Macnee and Hal Holbrook, both of which received little attention. After starring in Coins in the Fountain (1990), Anderson received considerable praise for her portrayal of comedian actress Thelma Todd in the television movie White Hot: The Mysterious Murder of Thelma Todd (1991). In the early 1990s, she attempted to co-star with her husband Burt Reynolds on his new CBS sitcom Evening Shade, but the network was not fond of the idea, thus replacing Anderson with Marilu Henner. After Delta Burke was fired from the CBS sitcom Designing Women in 1991, producers offered Anderson a role as Burke's replacement, which never came to pass because the network refused to pay Anderson the salary she had requested. She agreed to return as Jennifer Marlowe on two episodes of The New WKRP in Cincinnati, a sequel to the original series. In 1993, Anderson was added to the third season of the NBC sitcom Nurses, playing hospital administrator Casey MacAffee. Although her entering the series was an attempt to boost the series' ratings, the series was canceled shortly thereafter. Anderson has since returned to guest-starring on several popular television series, such as playing the "witch-trash" cousin on Sabrina the Teenage Witch and as Vallery Irons' mother on V.I.P. She also starred in the comedy film A Night at the Roxbury (1998).

In April 2018, Anderson was seen promoting the WKRP in Cincinnati television series and other classic television series on the MeTV television network.

Personal life 
Anderson has been married four times. Her first three husbands were Bruce Hasselberg (1964–1966), Ross Bickell (1973–1981), and actor Burt Reynolds (1988–1994). On May 17, 2008, she married musician Bob Flick, one of the founding members of the folk band The Brothers Four. They had originally met at a movie premiere in Minneapolis in 1963.

Anderson has two children: a daughter, Deidra (fathered by Hasselberg), and a son, Quinton (born in 1988), whom she and Reynolds adopted. She also has a sister, Andrea. Anderson's autobiography, My Life in High Heels, was published in 1995.

Growing up with parents of the World War II generation, who both smoked, Anderson witnessed the effects of chronic obstructive pulmonary disease (COPD), a lung disease often caused by smoking. In 1999, she became a spokesperson for a COPD support organization named COPD Together.

Filmography

Film

Television films

Television series

Further reading

References

External links 

 
 
 

1945 births
Living people
Actresses from Saint Paul, Minnesota
American film actresses
American television actresses
American voice actresses
People from Roseville, Minnesota
University of Minnesota alumni
Writers from Saint Paul, Minnesota
20th-century American actresses
21st-century American actresses
Roseville Area High School alumni